The Gnits standards are a collection of standards and recommendations for programming, maintaining, and distributing software.  They are published by a group of GNU project maintainers who call themselves "Gnits", which is short for "GNU nit-pickers".  As such, they represent advice, not Free Software Foundation or GNU policy, but parts of the Gnits' standards have seen widespread adoption among free software programmers in general.

The Gnits standards are extensions to, refinements of, and annotations for the GNU Standards.  However, they are in no way normative in GNU; GNU maintainers are not required to follow them. Nevertheless, maintainers and programmers often find in Gnits standards good ideas on the way to follow GNU Standards themselves, as well as tentative, non-official explanations about why some GNU standards were decided the way they are.  There are very few discrepancies between Gnits and GNU standards, and they are always well noted as such.

The standards address aspects of software architecture, program behaviour, human–computer interaction, C programming, documentation, and software releases.

As of 2008, the Gnits standards carry a notice that they are moribund and no longer actively maintained, and points readers to the manuals of Gnulib, Autoconf, and Automake, which are said to cover many of the same topics.

See also

GNU Autotools
GNU Coding Standards

External links
Gnits Standards
Gnits Standards (mirror)
Effect of Gnits on automake options

Computer standards
GNU Project
Computer programming
Free software culture and documents